Gretchen Castelo Barretto (born March 6, 1970) is a Filipino actress, socialite, and philanthropist. She was launched in Regal Films' 14 Going on Steady as a singer-actress, with the release of her debut single "Going Steady", which served as the soundtrack single to her debut film. In the late eighties, Barretto rose to prominence after gaining success in skin flicks produced by Seiko Films like Tukso, Layuan Mo Ako!, Ang Bukas Ay Akin, Ama, Bakit Mo Ako Pinabayaan?, Lumayo Ka Man Sa Akin and Bakit Ako Mahihiya?. She has released two studio albums under Star Records. Her debut album, Unexpected, was released in 2008, and her second album Complicated was released a year after. Her two younger sisters, Marjorie and Claudine, and niece Julia are also actresses. Since 2010, she is already a contract star of ABS-CBN.

Biography

1984–1987: Early career beginnings
Barretto was launched as one of the newest Regal Babies together with former child actress Janice de Belen and upcoming actress Nadia Montenegro. Barretto released her debut single entitled "Going Steady", which was also the official theme song of the movie 14 Going on Steady in which she top-billed along with de Belen and Montenegro. The single was critically panned but became a radio hit in the Philippines. Rumors swirled about the rift between Barretto and de Belen about who should have sung the soundtrack single. In the aforementioned film, Barretto was chosen to record the song, while de Belen got more screen time dancing to the song as shown in the movie credits. Barretto continued to star in films like Ang Mga Kuwento ni Lola Basyang, Paalam, Bukas ang Kasal Ko, Life Begins at 40 and Goat Buster. Despite being launched as a singer-actress, Barretto never got the chance to record a studio album due to the annual movies lined up for her. She soon dropped out of high school to fully concentrate on her acting career.

1988–1993: Softcore movies and hosting stint
In 1988, Barretto was signed by Robbie Tan to become a contract star of Seiko Films. In 1989, Barretto's image was revamped from being a teenybopper actress to a full-fledged sex siren. She appeared in several films like Ang Lihim Ng Golden Buddha, Ipaglalaban Ko, Tukso, Layuan Mo Ako!, Ama, Bakit Mo Ako Pinabayaan and Paminsan-Minsan. Due to the string of successful softcore films she starred in, Barretto, along with actresses Rita Avila, Cristina Gonzales and Rina Reyes, were tagged as the "ST Queens" (which stands for "sex trip") since they were among the most popular softcore actresses in Philippine cinema at that time.

In 1992, while shooting the movie Ako Ang Katarungan, Barretto was involved in a highly controversial relationship with married actor Bong Revilla whom she had an affair with for four months. Barretto moved back to her home studio Regal Films in that same year. Some of her biggest films included Bakit Ako Mahihiya? and Kailangan Kita in which she was paired opposite Gabby Concepcion, all of which were produced by Regal Films. In 1994, Barretto embarked on a hosting career. She joined Boy Abunda in the late night talk show Show & Tell. It was in that same year that she ended her contract with Seiko Films in an attempt to make her image more wholesome and commercial to the public. Barretto left Show & Tell after she became pregnant with Tonyboy Cojuangco's love child.  She was replaced in the show by another sexpot in Anjanette Abayari. The show was canceled in less than a year, after poor ratings.

In 1993 Barretto was linked to the Brunei beauties affair.

1994–1999: Public scandals and pregnancy
In June 1994, Barretto stood as the whistleblower to the scandal in the Manila Film Festival (not to be mistaken with the Metro Manila Film Festival which is held every December). In that said event, Barretto presented the award for Best Actress alongside Miss Universe Mauritius beauty queen Viveka Babajee and actor Rocky Gutierrez, where both announced actress Ruffa Gutierrez as the recipient of the award when it was Aiko Melendez who actually won the award. Rocky Gutierrez was caught on camera slipping the envelope with the winner's name in his pocket while Babajee was heard uttering the words "Take it! Take it!" while handing the award to Ruffa Gutierrez. The same incident happened to the announcement of the winner of Best Actor in which Ruffa Gutierrez and actress Nanette Medved declared Gabby Concepcion as the winner, when it was actor Edu Manzano who was the real recipient of the award. Barretto revealed that it was Concepcion's agent, Lolit Solis and Gutierrez' mother, Annabelle Rama (who was also Babajee's talent agent) who masterminded the apparent fraud, and she also told reporters that Solis promised her a Best Actress win, a year later if she kept quiet about this plan. Solis pleaded guilty to the offense of orchestrating the hoax, while siblings Ruffa and Rocky Gutierrez, Medved and Babajee were all charged with estafa.

A year later, Barretto got pregnant and gave birth to a daughter named Dominique. She also went public in announcing her relationship with billionaire business tycoon Antonio "Tony" Cojuangco Jr., a man twenty years her senior. Cojuangco admitted to being the father of Barretto's daughter. Barretto took a hiatus in showbiz to concentrate on her life as a mother, and partner to Cojuangco.

2000–2009: Showbiz comeback and music career launch
Throughout the late nineties, Barretto co-hosted the variety show ASAP in ABS-CBN but her serious comeback to acting began in a special portrayal in the drama series Sa Dulo Ng Walang Hanggan top-billed by sister Claudine Barretto in 2001. Barretto revealed that it was her sister Claudine who convinced her to return to acting after a long break from being away from the spotlight. In 2001, Barretto appeared with sisters Marjorie and Claudine in Private Conversations with Boy Abunda which became her first public interview together with her siblings. In 2006, Barretto and actress Dawn Zulueta engaged in heated exchange of insults after it was reported that the latter did not approve of the prima donna behavior displayed by the former during a Pantene shampoo commercial they made along with actresses Ruffa Gutierrez and Angel Aquino. Both actresses revealed that they were not in good terms with each other in separate interviews. Several months after the said incident, Zulueta told reporters that they have finally settled this issue in private. Later that year, Barretto finally accepted the lead role in the Metro Manila Film Festival entry Matakot Ka sa Karma released by Canary Films in December 2006. Matakot Ka Sa Karma became Barretto's first film since 1995's Tirad Pass: The Last Stand of Gen. Gregorio del Pilar and she received huge buzz regarding her movie comeback. Barretto was a no-show in the Metro Manila Film Festival Awards Ceremony as well as in the Parade of Stars several days prior to the event. The movie opened to modest reviews and placed fourth in the box office. Barretto was also set to reunite with former flame Bong Revilla in the movie Kapag Tumibok Ang Puso: Not Once, But Twice but backed out after a supposed feud arose between her and Revilla's wife Lani Mercado, during the film's pre-production. In 2007, a photo of Barretto kissing actor John Estrada circulated and went viral causing controversy in the showbiz industry. Both Barretto and Estrada denied having an affair or relationship.

In 2008, Barretto released her debut album Unexpected to signal the launch of her music career. She released the single "Please Don't Ask Me" in support of the album. She promoted Unexpected through a series of mall shows around the country. In that same year, Barretto returned to acting through an episode of Maalaala Mo Kaya where she played a mistress of a politician, opposite Phillip Salvador and Tonton Gutierrez. It was in this drama anthology that Barretto finally won her first acting award, PMPC Star Awards for TV's Best Single Performance by an Actress. A year later, she released her second album entitled Complicated and released the single "Ready to Take a Chance Again". Barretto was once again involved in a controversial relationship with Rodolfo "Dody" Puno, the Executive Director of the Road Board of the Department of Public Works and Highways. Rumors broke out that both Barretto and singer Pops Fernandez were receiving commission from the funds of the Department of Public Works and Highways, as allotted by Puno himself.

2010–present: Award wins and acting in primetime dramas
In 2010, Barretto returned to do another episode in Maalaala Mo Kaya portraying a widow who falls in love with a parish priest, which was portrayed by Jomari Yllana. Barretto again won another the award for Best Single Performance by an Actress in the PMPC Star Awards for Television, marking her second win in this category. Barretto embarked in her biggest television project in 2010 with the drama series Magkaribal, which originally featured Barretto opposite sister Claudine, however, the latter moved to rival network GMA during the show's pre-production. Magkaribal starred Barretto alongside actress Bea Alonzo (who became Claudine's replacement), Angel Aquino and model-actor Derek Ramsay. In that same year, Bench launched Barretto's first perfume line called Greta. Barretto won the award for Best Drama Actress in the PMPC Star Awards for Television for Magkaribal a year later. After the success of the show, Barretto was slated to star in Alta, a drama series about high society and the mining industry, with KC Concepcion and Angelica Panganiban, but the show was shelved in 2012. It was because of the cancellation of Alta that she was offered the role of Ashi Behati in Princess and I in which she portrayed the main villain to the lead stars Kathryn Bernardo and Daniel Padilla. In 2013, Barretto joined the cast of Huwag Ka Lang Mawawala at the request of the show's lead actress, Judy Ann Santos. Two months later, Barretto debuted in her first Cinemalaya movie entry entitled The Diplomat Hotel.

Personal life
Barretto is the fifth out of seven children by Miguel Alvir Barretto and Estrella Castelo Barretto. Her two younger siblings Marjorie Barretto, Claudine Barretto, and niece Julia Barretto are also actresses. Barretto has one child with common-law partner and businessman Antonio "Tony Boy" Cojuangco Jr.

Discography

 Unexpected (2008)
 Complicated (2009)

Filmography

Film

Television

Awards and nominations

References

External links

1970 births
Living people
21st-century Filipino actresses
Gretchen
De La Salle University alumni
Filipino child actresses
Filipino film actresses
Filipino television actresses
Filipino television personalities
GMA Network personalities
ABS-CBN personalities
Star Magic